This is a listing of American television network programs currently airing or have aired during evening.

Evening news programming begins at 6:30pm, 5:30pm, or 3:30pm Eastern Time Zone/Pacific Time Zone, after network affiliates' late local news. On PBS, and cable television, news starts at 6:00 pm, earlier, or later ET/PT.

Current 
All times Eastern Time Zone/Pacific Time Zone—see effects of time on North American broadcasting for explanation.

Former

Broadcast networks

NBC 
 The Huntley–Brinkley Report (October 29, 1956 – July 31, 1970)
 Sunday Night with Megyn Kelly (June 4, 2017 – July 30, 2017)

PBS 

 Nightly Business Report (January 21, 1979 – December 27, 2019; distributed by American Public Television)

Cable networks

CNBC 

 Bullseye (December 8, 2003 – March 11, 2005)
 Business Center (1997 – December 5, 2003)
 The News with Shepard Smith (September 30, 2020 – November 3, 2022)
 On the Money (October 3, 2005 – August 29, 2009)

CNN 

 Connie Chung Tonight (June 24, 2002 – March 2003) 
 Cuomo Prime Time (August 28, 2017 – November 29, 2021; cancelled after Chris Cuomo's suspension on November 30, 2021, and then fired on December 4, 2021)
 Democracy in Peril (January 17, 2022 – January 28, 2022)
 Larry King Live (June 3, 1985 – December 16, 2010)
 Piers Morgan Live (January 17, 2011 – March 28, 2014)
 Don Lemon Tonight (April 14, 2014 – October 7, 2022; moved to CNN This Morning)
 John King, USA (March 22, 2010 – June 29, 2012)
 NewsNight with Aaron Brown (November 5, 2001 – November 4, 2005)
 Sports Tonight (June 1, 1980 – May 15, 2002)

Fox News 

 The O'Reilly Factor (October 7, 1996 – April 21, 2017)

Fox Business 
 Lou Dobbs Tonight (2011 – February 5, 2021; cancelled due to voting fraud for the 2020 United States Presidential Election)

References

Lists of American television series
American television news shows